Brockington may refer to:

People 
Blake Brockington (1996–2015), American trans man
Darien Brockington, American singer
Ian Brockington (born 1935), British cardiologist
Izaiah Brockington (born 1999), American basketball player
John Brockington (born 1948), American football player
Leonard Brockington (1888–1966), Canadian lawyer

Places 
 Brockington, Saskatchewan
 Brockington College